Gérard Quintyn (born 2 January 1947) is a French former cyclist. He competed in the sprint event at the 1972 Summer Olympics.

References

External links
 

1947 births
Living people
People from Choisy-le-Roi
French male cyclists
Olympic cyclists of France
Cyclists at the 1972 Summer Olympics